This is a list of settlements in the Karditsa regional unit, Greece:

 Achladia
 Agia Paraskevi
 Agia Triada
 Agiopigi
 Agios Akakios
 Agios Dimitrios
 Agios Georgios
 Agios Theodoros
 Agios Vissarios
 Agnantero
 Aidonochori
 Amarantos
 Ampeliko
 Ampelos
 Amygdali
 Anavra
 Anogeio
 Anthiro
 Anthochori
 Apidea
 Argithea
 Argyri
 Artesiano
 Asimochori
 Astritsa
 Belokomiti
 Charma
 Dafnospilia
 Dasochori
 Drakotrypa
 Drosato
 Ellinika
 Ellinokastro
 Ellinopyrgos
 Ermitsi
 Fanari
 Filia
 Fountoto
 Fragko
 Fylakti
 Fyllo
 Gefyria
 Gelanthi
 Georgiko
 Gorgovites
 Grammatiko
 Itea
 Kali Komi
 Kallifoni
 Kallithiro
 Kalogriana
 Kalyvakia
 Kanalia
 Kappadokiko
 Kappas
 Karditsa
 Karditsomagoula
 Karitsa Dolopon
 Karoplesi
 Karpochori
 Karvasara
 Karya
 Kastania
 Katafygio
 Katafylli
 Kedros
 Kerasea
 Koskina
 Koumpouriana
 Kranea
 Krya Vrysi
 Kryoneri
 Kryopigi
 Ktimeni
 Kypseli
 Lampero
 Lazarina
 Lefki
 Leontari
 Leontito
 Loutro
 Loutropigi
 Loxada
 Magoula
 Magoulitsa
 Makrychori
 Marathea
 Marathos
 Markos
 Mascholouri
 Mataragka
 Mavrommati
 Melissa
 Melissochori
 Mesenikolas
 Mesovouni
 Metamorfosi
 Mitropoli
 Molocha
 Morfovouni
 Moschato 
 Mouzaki
 Myrina
 Neochori
 Neraida
 Orfana
 Oxya
 Palaiochori
 Palaiokklisi
 Palamas
 Paliouri
 Paschalitsa
 Pedino
 Pefkofyto
 Petrilo
 Petrino
 Petroto
 Pezoula
 Porti
 Portitsa
 Proastio 
 Prodromos
 Ptelopoula
 Pyrgos Ithomis
 Pyrgos Kieriou
 Rachoula
 Rentina
 Rizovouni
 Rousso
 Sofades
 Stavros
 Stefaniada
 Sykies
 Therino
 Thrapsimi
 Vathylakkos
 Vatsounia
 Vlasi
 Vlochos
 Vragkiana
 Xinoneri
 Zaimi

By municipality

Karditsa